Sage-Robinson-Nagel House, also known as the Historical Museum of the Wabash Valley, is a historic home located at Terre Haute, Vigo County, Indiana. It was built in 1868, and is a two-story, "L"-shaped, Italianate style brick dwelling. It has a low-pitched hipped roof with heavy double brackets, decorative front porch, and a projecting bay window.

It was listed on the National Register of Historic Places in 1973. It is located in the Farrington's Grove Historic District.

References

External links
Vigo County Historical Museum

Individually listed contributing properties to historic districts on the National Register in Indiana
History museums in Indiana
Houses on the National Register of Historic Places in Indiana
Italianate architecture in Indiana
Houses completed in 1868
Museums in Vigo County, Indiana
Buildings and structures in Terre Haute, Indiana
National Register of Historic Places in Terre Haute, Indiana